John J. Choi (born June 2, 1970) is an American attorney and politician who has served as the county attorney of Ramsey County, Minnesota since 2011. He served as Saint Paul City Attorney from 2006 to 2010. Choi is a first-generation Korean-American immigrant and the first Korean American to serve as a county attorney in the United States. He has gained attention for his office's successful prosecutions of human trafficking and for his support of criminal justice reform efforts.

Early life and career 
Choi was born in Seoul and immigrated to the United States with his parents in 1973.  The family resided for a time in Saint Paul's Skyline Tower, the largest subsidized housing complex in the United States west of Chicago.  Choi is a graduate of St. Thomas Academy and Marquette University.  In 1995, he received a juris doctor from Hamline University Law School and graduated from the University of Minnesota Humphrey School of Public Affairs as a Humphrey Fellow.  Prior to graduating from law school, Choi was a legislative aide to Saint Paul City Council member Bob Long and was active in Twin Cities politics.

Between 1995 and 2006, Choi practiced commercial litigation, government relations law, and municipal law with the Twin Cities firms Hessian, McKasy, & Soderberg and Kennedy & Graven, where he became a partner at age thirty. In 2006, he was appointed by Mayor Chris Coleman as Saint Paul City Attorney.  As city attorney, Choi served as the city's chief legal counsel and supervised misdemeanor prosecutions.

Tenure as county attorney 
In 2010, Choi stepped down as city attorney to run for Ramsey County Attorney, an office vacated by the retiring Susan Gaertner. He received the Democratic-Farmer-Labor Party's endorsement and won the August 2010 primary election over attorney David Schultz and Roseville City Council member Tammy Pust, ultimately prevailing over Schultz in the November general election. Choi was reelected without opposition in 2014 and reelected in 2018 over Luke Kyper Bellville with 78.4% of the vote.

As county attorney, Choi oversees all felony prosecutions in Ramsey County, serves as the county's chief legal counsel, and manages the county's child support services. He has embraced criminal justice reform initiatives, establishing a veterans' treatment court, engaging in community prosecution efforts, and working to reduce racial disparities.  Along with other reform-minded prosecutors, he has participated in the Institute for Innovation in Prosecution. Choi has also aggressively prosecuted human trafficking and other cases of violence against women, earning recognition from other county attorneys in Minnesota for these efforts.

Since taking office in 2011, Choi has overseen several high-profile prosecutions. In 2015, he announced the indictment of the Roman Catholic Archdiocese of Saint Paul and Minneapolis for crimes related to the coverup of sexual abuse cases. In 2017, Choi's office prosecuted St. Anthony police officer Jeronimo Yanez for manslaughter after the death of Philando Castile in Falcon Heights, Minnesota.

References 

1970 births
Living people
People from Seoul
South Korean emigrants to the United States
Marquette University alumni
Hamline University School of Law alumni
Humphrey School of Public Affairs alumni
Minnesota lawyers
American prosecutors